The blackthroat seaperch (Doederleinia berycoides), also known as the rosy seabass , is a species of fish in the family Acropomatidae, the temperate ocean-basses or lanternbellies. It is the only species in the monotypic genus Doederleinia. It is native to the eastern Indian Ocean and the western Pacific Ocean from Japan to Australia. In Japan it is known as Nodoguro, or Akamutsu.

Its head and body are red in color. It lacks the luminous organ present in many other members of the lanternbelly family. It has rows of conical teeth with large canines. The fish grows to a length of  TL.

The rosy seabass is of commercial importance as a food fish. This high value has inspired biological and ecological studies that may be useful in the management of its fishery.

The generic name honours the German zoologist Ludwig Heinrich Philipp Döderlein (1855-1936).

References

Acropomatidae
Monotypic fish genera
Taxa named by Franz Martin Hilgendorf
Fish described in 1879